Soest station is a passenger station in the city of Soest in the German state of North Rhine-Westphalia. It is on the Hamm–Warburg and the Dortmund–Soest lines. It was also served by passenger trains on the Möhne Valley Railway (Möhnetalbahn) from 1899 to 1960.

Train services
It is served by occasional Intercity services. In regional traffic, it is served by the Rhein-Hellweg-Express on the Düsseldorf–Soest route every two hours. The Rhein-Hellweg-Express is operated by DB Regio NRW. It is served by the Ems-Börde-Bahn stopping service every 30 minutes, operating on the Hamm–Paderborn route and the Hellweg-Bahn stopping service every 30 minutes, operating on the Dortmund–Soest route. The Hellweg-Bahn and the Ems-Börde-Bahn are operated by Eurobahn (Keolis).

The following services currently call at Soest:
Rhein-Hellweg-Express Düsseldorf – Düsseldorf Airport – Duisburg – Essen – Dortmund-Hörde – Unna – Paderborn – Kassel-Wilhelmshöhe

Station
The Soest station was extensively renovated and refurbished up to 2010 to meet its role as both a regional station as well as a (touristic) gateway to the city. In addition to the renovation of the building and its environment, about five hectares of industrial land has been created. The building of a new underpass gives direct access to the north side of the town. In addition, the level of platform 1 was raised. In addition, the station has new retail, sanitary facilities and automatic teller machines on the ground floor with office space on the upper floors.

References

Railway stations in North Rhine-Westphalia
Railway stations in Germany opened in 1850
1850 establishments in Prussia
Buildings and structures in Soest (district)